Harold Smith was an English professional rugby league footballer who played in the 1920s.

International honours
Herbert Smith won a cap for England while at Halifax in 1927 against Wales, and won caps for Great Britain while at Bradford Northern in 1926-27 against New Zealand (2 matches).

Note
There was a Herbert Smith who won the 1947 Challenge Cup with Bradford Northern, they are unlikely to be the same person, but they may be related.

References

Bradford Bulls players
England national rugby league team players
English rugby league players
Great Britain national rugby league team players
Halifax R.L.F.C. players
Year of death missing
Place of birth missing
Rugby league hookers
Year of birth missing